Robin Winters (born 1950 in Benicia, California) is an American conceptual artist and teacher based in New York.  Winters is known for creating solo exhibitions containing an interactive durational performance component to his installations, sometimes lasting up to two months. As an early practitioner of Relational Aesthetics Winters has incorporated such devices as blind dates, double dates, dinners, fortune telling, and free consultation in his performances. Throughout his career he has engaged in a wide variety of media, such as performance art, film, video, writing prose and poetry, photography, installation art, printmaking, drawing, painting, ceramic sculpture, bronze sculpture, and glassblowing. Recurring imagery in his work includes faces, boats, cars, bottles, hats, and the fool.

Early life and education 

Winters was born in Benicia, California in 1950 to lawyer parents. As a child his hobby was collecting glass bottles found on the beach and under old buildings, which would later influence him as an artist.  Winters attended Benicia High School until the end of his sophomore year.  He then traveled to British Columbia to a take part in a Quaker school work-study program.
After traveling briefly to Alaska, Winters returned to Benicia in 1968.  He worked in the Weldon Leather Tannery, the Allied Products Wire Wonder Utility Factory making laundry baskets, and the Clearwater Ranch in Cloverdale, where he was a live-in counselor for autistic children. 

Also in 1968, Winters had his first durational performance, entitled Norman Thomas Travelling Museum.  The artist drove a Volkswagen bus decorated in collage, many of the images relating to current events and politics.  Inside was what the artist described as a “reliquary” containing many objects, including a bottle collection.  Winters took the van to shopping centers and even as far as Mexico.

Selected career

1970s

In 1974, Winters performed The Secret Life of Bob-E or Bob-E Behind the Veil eight hours a day, five days a week for a month in his studio apartment.  Behind a one-way mirror the audience could watch Winters play the character of Bob-E, whose goal was to make a monument for everyone in the world in the form of blue and yellow rubber top hats.  By the end of the month the artist had constructed 262 hats.

The following year, Winters was invited to take part in the Whitney Museum's 1975 Biennial Exhibition.  Entitled W.B. Bearman Bags a Job or Diary of a Dreamer, Winters’ piece was the first durational performance in the museum.  For two months the artist traveled by subway to the museum, sometimes in a bear mask – one of several he wore for his piece.  There he would punch into a time clock and enter a self-made box divided into two parts, one part for the artist and the smaller part for the audience.  The two sections were divided by a one-way mirror which the artist used to give the audience occasional glimpses of his environment.  Winters could also play music, speak to the audience, and even tell their fortune through a microphone installed in the box.
Throughout the rest of 1975 and 1976 Winters traveled throughout Europe and North Africa, showing a solo exhibition entitled Dedication to the Man Whose Main Job Was Testing Whistling Tea Kettles in 1975 at the Konrad Fischer Gallery in Düsseldorf, West Germany.    

Also in 1976, Winters formed the partnership “X&Y” with fellow artist Coleen Fitzgibbon that would last two years. Together they performed a series of shows in the Netherlands, most notably a show entitled Take the Money and Run. Performed at De Appel in Amsterdam, the show involved the artists robbing their audience. The following day the audience was given an apology, as well as the opportunity to retrieve any valuables and participate in a lottery to win the artists’ services.  They also made a Super 8 film in NY called Rich-Poor, in which they asked people on the streets their thoughts on the rich and poor.

As they became more involved in their own work and producing Colab group exhibitions, Winters and Fitzgibbon ended their partnership as X&Y.  Winters produced several exhibitions at his studio, including The Doctors and Dentists Show, The Dog Show, and The Batman Show, which was organized by Diego Cortez.

1980s

In 1980 Winters participated in The Times Square Show, The Real Estate Show and in Absurdities at ABC No Rio.   That same year he and artists Peter Fend, Coleen Fitzgibbon, Peter Nadin, Jenny Holzer, and Richard Prince also formed The Offices of Fend, Fitzgibbon, Holzer, Nadin, Prince & Winters.  This short-lived collective was based out of an office on lower Broadway and offered “Practical Esthetic Services Adaptable to Client Situation”, as stated on their business card.  Their goal was to offer their art as “socially helpful work for hire”.   In June of that year Winters participated in The Times Square Show, Colab's most well-known exhibition.  The month-long show took place in a four floor building on West 41st Street and was densely packed with art.   To cap off a busy year, Winters also became one of the first artists to join the Mary Boone Gallery, showing a successful solo exhibition in 1981. In 1982, Winters had his first solo exhibition in Los Angeles at the Richard Kuhlenschmidt Gallery

At the Mo David Gallery in 1984, Winters created an installation piece that consisted of a floor of plaster tiles.  Underneath each tile, hidden from view, was a drawing.   The same year, Winters performed Please Don’t Disturb me While I’m Drawing in the Perfo 2 festival at Lantaren/Venster in Rotterdam, the Netherlands.  While he was there, he offered his aesthetic services to all of the other artists in attendance.  He designed the stage sets for the musician Nico, and assisted French artist Orlan, American artist Stuart Sherman, and American poet Gregory Corso.   Two years later Winters was invited to take part in Chambres d’Amis (In Ghent there is Always a Free Room for Albrecht Durer) in Ghent, Belgium.  In it, 51 artists created installations in 50 different sites, mostly private homes.  Winters chose the home of a local art historian.  The artist made 90 drawings based on images found in the large collection of art books in the home's library.  He made two copies of each drawing and placed the originals in the books themselves.  One set of copies was exhibited in the sponsoring museum, Museum van Hedendaagse, as "The Ghent Drawings".    The drawings were also on display at Winters’ solo exhibition at Luhring Augustine & Hodes Gallery in New York City in 1987.

In 1986, Winters had a solo exhibition at Maurice Keitelman Gallery in Brussels, Belgium, and the following year a solo exhibition at the Centre Régional d'Art Contemporain Midi-Pyrénées in Toulouse, France.  Also in 1986, Winters' Playroom was held at the Institute for Contemporary Art in Boston, Massachusetts.  The exhibition was part of Think Tank, a retrospective of Winters' work which traveled to the Stedelijk Museum in the Netherlands, the Centre Regional d’Art Contemporain in France, and the Contemporary Arts Center in Ohio.   In the Playroom, walls were covered with paper and cardboard boxes were placed in the room, all with the purpose of the audience being able to create their own art.  Both children and adults were encouraged to participate.
Winters spent a month in 1989 working with students at the San Francisco Art Institute. Never having worked with ceramics, he spent the month making numerous ceramic pieces, which were then shown in the aptly named One Month in San Francisco. Other components of the piece included Winters’ childhood bottle collection and a video showing each piece in the show filmed briefly next to a ruler.   Also that year, Robin served as a visiting artist at the Pilchuck Glass School, where he met the artist John Drury, who was then working as the school's artist liaison. Winters again explored the accessibility of art, as he did in Playroom, with his exhibition Train of Thought/Objects of Influence, held in 1989 at both the Wadsworth Atheneum's Lion and Matrix galleries in Hartford, Connecticut—that exhibition installed by himself and Drury, whom Winters had employed as his studio assistant on returning to New York City, following his engagement at the Pilchuck Glass School.  The use of such devices as audiotapes, Braille-like mono-types, low display furniture, wide aisles and ramps, and walls with colors and scents to make sure that his target audience of the visually and auditory impaired were included.  Winters also made a number of objects available to the audience so that they could handle them, adding another sensory element to the show.   The artist has been quoted as saying, "My work is about the interplay between the artist and viewer."

1990s

In the summer of 1990, Winters interviewed fellow artist Kiki Smith for her eponymous book, which was published later that year. That same year (1990), Winters was invited by the Val Saint Lambert glass factory in Belgium to create glassworks in their facility. Winters, artists John Drury and Tracy Glover traveled to Liege from the US, and the three in combination with two of the factories master glassblowers, realized Mr. Winters' work over six weeks time. The artist continued to work with the factory for several years, making his own pieces and offering his input as a designer. A portion of the works, a group of glass heads and hats that the artist had produced at the factory, were exhibited in 1990 at the Centre d’Art Contemporain Geneve in Geneva, Switzerland.  Later in the year they were included in his solo exhibition at Brooke Alexander Gallery in New York City. They were also shown at Facts and Rumours, an exhibition at the Witte de With Center for Contemporary Art in Rotterdam, the Netherlands in 1991.
Winters had a solo exhibition at Van Esch Galerie in Eindhoven, the Netherlands called I am not Indifferent in 1991.  The show consisted of paintings, glass heads, and bronze sculpture.    Two years later he had another solo exhibition at the Renaissance Society at the University of Chicago, entitled Human Nature.  Several hundred heads, made of glass and ceramic, lined the walls and were arranged in rings on the floor.  Also on display were various paintings and bronzes.   At one end of the gallery Winters set up a work space where he also answered questions about the pieces on display and showed video of the creation of the pieces.
In 1994 Winters had a show at the Michael Klein Gallery in New York City entitled Notes from the Finishing Room, a solo exhibition of paintings.   The artist also collaborated with fellow Benicia natives and glass artists Lee Roy Champagne and Michael Nourot to create pieces for Glass Roots, held in his hometown of Benicia, California at the Arts Benicia Center Gallery.   In 1997 Winters participated in the exhibition Het Drinkglas, or The Drinking Glass, at Stichting Leerdam Glasmanifestatie in Leerdam, the Netherlands, and in 2000 he had a solo exhibition called Flowering at Brutto Gusto in Rotterdam, the Netherlands.

2000s - present

From 2001 to early 2003, Winters work was exhibited along with other contemporary artists in Heart of Glass.  The show began at the Queens Museum of Art in New York City, and the next year traveled to the Crafts Council in London, England.   In 2007, Winters had a solo exhibition at Brutto Gusto in Berlin, Germany.  The show, entitled Please Forgive Me, I am an American, consisted of a selection of the artist's work from the previous twenty years.
Interest in the legacy of Colab saw a resurgence beginning in 2011, and Winters’ work was included in the exhibition A Show About Colab (And Related Activities) held at Printed Matter in New York City.  The show covered many of Colab's endeavors from the late seventies to the early eighties.   The following year The Times Square Show Revisited was held in the Bertha and Karl Leubsdorf Art Gallery at Hunter College in New York City.  Along with his work being included in the show, Winters took part in a panel discussion at the college.
Also in 2012, Winters took part in It’s Always Summer on the Inside, an exhibition of paintings and large drawings held at the Anton Kern Gallery in New York City.   In January 2013 Winters’ work was featured in the exhibition A Vase is a Vase is a Vase, held at Brutto Gusto in Berlin, Germany.

Critical response 

“If Winters's work is about anything it is the need to make art, and the belief that if one never stops thinking, playing and working some sort of magic will occur. Winters is an artist because art is vital, and his constant process of change only makes being an artist all the more rejuvenating and intense.”   Joe Scanlan, Robin Winters, exhibition catalogue at the Renaissance Society

“His work is consistent in its tossed-off nonchalance and its often rugged physicality, but it fluctuates in terms of paint handling, drawing, subject matter, as well as the choices of materials and media.  The disparate manifestations of Winters’ sensibility – which include paintings, drawings, installation pieces, and performance – often appear to be the products of a changing cast of characters rather than a fixed persona.” Roberta Smith, Think Tank, exhibition catalogue at the Institute of Contemporary Art, Boston

“At heart a Conceptualist, he has explored so many forms (he shows often but rarely in the same place twice) that you begin to suspect it’s all an elaborate tease to keep us wondering what he will do next, and where.  Fortunately, Winters’ guessing game rewards patience: in it artist and art are of a piece, and the approach/avoidance, sniper-action strategy that has defined his career is also the crucial substance of his work.”  Holland Cotter, Art in America

Teaching 

Winters teaches at the School of Visual Arts (SVA), in New York City.

Awards 
 1978   New York State Council on the Arts Grant
 1980   National Endowment for the Arts Grant
 1985   Engelhard Foundation Grant
 1991   New York Foundation for the Arts Grant
 1998   John Simon Guggenheim Memorial Foundation Fellowship in Fine Arts

Collections 

 Museum Boijmans Van Beuningen
 Brooklyn Museum
 Centraal Museum
 Groninger Museum
 List Visual Arts Center 
 MacArthur Foundation
Metropolitan Museum of Art
 Museum of Modern Art
National Gallery of Art
 New Museum
Princessehof Ceramics Museum
 Philadelphia Museum of Art
 San Francisco Museum of Modern Art
 Stedelijk Museum
 The Arts Club – Chicago, IL
 Berkeley Art Museum and Pacific Film Archive
 Whitney Museum of American Art
 Williams College Museum of Art

References

External links 
Robin Winters at the Museum of Modern Art
Robin Winters faculty profile at the School of Visual Arts

1950 births
Living people
People from Benicia, California
American conceptual artists
American performance artists
American installation artists
School of Visual Arts faculty
Rhode Island School of Design faculty
Temple University faculty
California Institute of the Arts faculty
Sarah Lawrence College faculty